Stephen Joseph McMahon (born 31 July 1984) is an English former footballer who played as a defender.

Career
McMahon started his career at Blackpool making his debut in 2002 whilst his father Steve McMahon was manager. In 2004 Blackpool won the Football League Trophy and McMahon played as a substitute in the final. In September 2004, he joined Kidderminster Harriers on loan where he made six appearances in all competitions before returning to Blackpool. In February 2005, McMahon joined Perth Glory where his father had recently been appointed as manager. His father had to defend the signing after claims of nepotism in the media. He made 12 appearances for the club.

Personal life
McMahon is the son of former England international footballer Steve McMahon who he played under at Blackpool and Perth Glory.

References

1984 births
Living people
A-League Men players
Association football defenders
Blackpool F.C. players
English footballers
Kidderminster Harriers F.C. players
Footballers from Southport
Perth Glory FC players
English Football League players
Expatriate soccer players in Australia
Association football midfielders
English expatriate footballers
English expatriate sportspeople in Australia